Last Planet Standing is a 5-issue comic book limited series, published by Marvel Comics in 2006. The series was written by Tom DeFalco and drawn by Pat Olliffe (who also co-plotted the series). It stars many characters from the MC2 Universe and is a sequel to the 2005 miniseries Last Hero Standing.

Plot summary
The limited series begins with Reed and Sue Richards investigating a strange phenomena in another galaxy. Reed realizes that Earth may be in danger within a week. However, before he can send a message to warn Earth, an alien vessel causes a sun in the middle of the galaxy to overload and implode, creating a massive shockwave that destroys his ship.

The occupant of the alien vessel is revealed to be Dominas the Wavemaster, a Herald of Galactus. Dominas flies toward the Shi'ar Imperial Throneworld, where he battles Gladiator and the rest of the Shi'ar Imperial Guard.

On Earth, the rest of the Fantastic Five receive Reed's transmission. They rush into a rescue operation while Doom stays behind to warn the President and the other heroes. Doom informs A-Next of the current situation, but they are busy dealing with their lifelong adversaries, the Red Queen and her Revengers. Jarvis sends A-Next the emergency call and Stinger calls her team back, realizing that protecting Earth is more important than fighting the Revengers.

Vision discusses matters with G. W. Bridge, the current President of the United States, who is not sure how to handle things.

At Barton's Dojo, American Dream trains with Freebooter and Hawkeye. American Dream is considering leaving the Avengers, which disappoints Hawkeye. At school, May Parker chats with her friends about her future plans and later leaves to perform her daily role as Spider-Girl. She receives a call from Stinger, who is summoning all of the reserve Avengers.

Dominas continues to wreak havoc on the Shi'ar Throneworld, and his master Galactus prepares to devour it completely. While Lilandra is ushered into safety, her Imperial Guard do their best to protect her world. Despite the Guards' efforts, Galactus's elemental converter drains the planet dry. Galactus reveals to Dominas that he no longer desires to merely sate his hunger, but to gather energy with the intention of evolving to the next level. The newly birthed Captain America star is vital to his plan. Galactus decides to absorb Asgard next.

The Fantastic Five head to the galaxy where Reed and Sue's ship was destroyed, but find nothing. However, they receive a signal and head straight toward it. As they hoped, the signal is coming from Reed and Sue. Sue had created a force field to protect them both while their ship exploded. Once the F5 find their missing teammates, they advise the President about the situation and head back home to help deal with it. Reed Richards has a long-standing plan to stop Galactus if it should ever become necessary.

Meanwhile, Thor leads his mighty warriors into battle against Galactus. Galactus sends for his robotic troops to protect him. Spider-Girl and Vision arrive at Avengers Compound. Vision has already sent Nova and Earth Sentry into space to investigate matters. He orders the other A-Next members to wait. The situation worsens when the Revengers show up again, and A-Next want to take them down. Vision refuses to allow this because of the President's orders.

The gods realize they are outmatched against Galactus. While Thor is taken prisoner by Galactus, the other Asgardians escape. Dominas also apprehends the Odinsword for its cosmic power. Galactus absorbs the entire world of Asgard with the sword he finds.

Back on Earth, Vision has agreed to send in a few members of A-Next to battle the Revengers, including Spider-Girl, Stinger, Mainframe, and Thunderstrike. As Thunderstrike faces Sabreclaw, he suddenly loses his powers due to the demise of Asgard. As Thunderstrike's secret identity is revealed, Spider-Girl and the rest decide to let the Revengers escape to bring their teammate into safety.

Dominas attacks the Watcher, destroying the moon in the process. He telepathically announces the imminent destruction of Earth to its populace, causing widespread panic.

Many of the Great Powers of the Universe gather at the far edge of reality to discuss Galactus's latest actions. They unite their power to send a Galactus-destroying bolt towards Earth, knowing that it could destroy the entire Milky Way. Reed Richards makes a desperate decision to use his single-shot transdimensional cannon, which is his one hope of stopping Galactus, against the bolt and its originators.

Galactus arrives on Earth, causing tremendous planet-wide destruction and chaos. While the heroes do their best to keep everyone safe, Dominas reveals that Galactus plans to destroy the entire universe so a new "Big Bang" can take place and an entire new universe can be formed. The Captain America star is to be the focus, and all the gathered living energies are to be directed at it in a recreation, on a far greater scale, of the sun-implosion at the beginning of the miniseries. As Reed Richards realizes, that was merely a test run.

The Silver Surfer learns of his former master's plans, and arrives on Earth to deal with it. He and Dominas face each other. The Surfer triumphs, absorbing Dominas's Power Cosmic and becoming even more powerful than before. He then focuses on Galactus. The Fantastic Five, A-Next, X-People, and Revengers all team up to stop Galactus. The Surfer's Power Cosmic and Scarlet Witch's reality-altering power combined enable Reed's machine to destroy Galactus's barrier, and Stinger, American Dream and Spider-Girl manage to reverse the effect of Galactus' device, causing him immense pain through an overload of energies. Death appears before Galactus in a vision, and she laments that though he'd ever been one of her most loyal advocates, Galactus was always destined to die.

As the Surfer eventually faces the dying, energy-saturated Galactus, they somehow merge into a new unnamed entity who declares that a new form of energy, the "Power Essential," has been born through the union. Instantly repairing the damage Galactus caused on Earth, the entity vows to be a builder of worlds and a guardian of life, bringing life and joy to dead planets. He can thus be seen as the "anti-Galactus". He is a silver giant, clad in a silver armor similar to Galactus', who travels by cosmic surfboard.

As the heroes watch the entity leave, new allies are made, and while some may only last for a while, others will be explored further in the future. They look upon the sky, and see the Captain America star once again.

Main characters in the miniseries

Collected editions
The limited series has been collected in a trade paperback:

Last Planet Standing (120 pages, October 2006)

Significance and reception
When this miniseries was first introduced to the fans, Marvel revealed that it would be the final adventures of the MC2 universe. Likewise, in the ongoing Spider-Girl series, a storyline took place in which she was supposed to die. When the fans "revolted" against this decision, it was quickly made clear that the final pages of the miniseries were not yet completed and that if this series was well by the public, the MC2 universe would be spared. With many unresolved plot lines, and Last Planet Standing being well-received, it was decided to let the MC2 universe continue. While the original Spider-Girl series would be cancelled by issue #100, a few months later it was relaunched as Amazing Spider-Girl #1.

References

External links

Marvel Comics' description of series, by issue: #1, #2, #3, #4, #5

Comics set on fictional planets
Marvel Comics 2